Umran Savaş İnan (born December 28, 1950) is a Turkish scientist at Koç University and Stanford University in the field of geophysics and very low frequency radio science. İnan was the president of Koç University between 2009 and 2021.

Life and career
İnan received his B.Sc. degree in 1972 and M.Sc. in 1973 from the Middle East Technical University (METU). He conducted his doctoral research during four years at Stanford University, receiving a Ph.D. in 1977 in electrical engineering under the tutelage of Robert Helliwell. İnan later joined the staff of Stanford as research affiliate and in 1982 was appointed as assistant professor in the Department of Electrical Engineering. He subsequently became associate professor in 1985 and then full professor at Stanford since 1992.

In 1997, he was appointed director of Space, Telecommunications and Radio Science Laboratories (STAR) connected to Stanford and continued his duty here until September 2009. During his academic career at Stanford he worked in areas geophysics, near-space, ionospheric and atmospheric physics, radiation belts, electromagnetic wave-particle interaction, and very low frequency radioscience. Inan has had about 50 PhD students so far.
 
He had been the president of Koç University between 2009 and 2021. Currently, the research group at Stanford University is conducting observations from over 50 different spots on seven continents and also from a variety of world-orbiting satellites. He became professor emeritus at Stanford in 2011, and remains active there along with his duties at Koç University.

İnan has over 323 refereed scientific and technical papers.

With his brother, Aziz İnan, he has authored three textbooks on electromagnetics:
 Engineering Electromagnetics (Prentice Hall 1998)
 Electromagnetic Waves (Prentice Hall 1999)
 Principles of Plasma Physics for Scientists and Engineers (Cambridge Press 2011)

The first two textbooks were then combined into a second edition, Engineering Electromagnetics and Waves, by the same two authors along with Ryan Said.

Membership and awards
İnan has been active member of various organizations since 1973 and he has been awarded by many institutions so far. 
 
Besides being a member of the Institute of Electrical and Electronics Engineers (IEEE), the International Radio Science Association, the American Physical Society (APS), the Electromagnetic Academy, the Academy of Tau Beta Pi, the Sigma Xi Academy, and TUBA, İnan was also awarded by Aeronautics and Space Administration NASA with group achievement award in years 1983, 1998 and 2004.

Research at Stanford
Research activities at Stanford include
Effects of lightning on the ionosphere and magnetosphere
Precipitating electrons from the radiation belts caused by VLF waves, both natural (lightning) and manmade (VLF transmitters)
Generation of ELF/VLF waves with the HAARP facility in Alaska
Wave-particle interactions between ELF/VLF waves and energetic radiation belt particles
VLF remote sensing of ionospheric disturbances from cosmic gamma-ray sources
AWESOME ELF/VLF instrument distribution under the International Heliophysical Year
Investigation of naturally generated chorus and hiss waves in the ELF/VLF band

Inan Peak

References

External links
Very Low Frequency Group webpage
AWESOME global instrument program official website
Personal Profile
Koc University web page - biography

1950 births
Fellows of the American Physical Society
Fellows of the American Geophysical Union
Fellow Members of the IEEE
Academic staff of Koç University
Living people
Members of the Turkish Academy of Sciences
Middle East Technical University alumni
People from Erzincan
Recipients of TÜBİTAK Science Award
Rectors of universities and colleges in Turkey
Stanford University alumni
Stanford University Department of Electrical Engineering faculty
Turkish electrical engineers
Turkish scientists
Turkish engineering academics